Debreceni EAC, commonly known as DEAC, is a professional basketball club from Debrecen, Hungary. It is part of the multi-sports club, Debreceni EAC.

History
The basketball section of Debreceni EAC was founded in 2012. The club plays its home games at the Oláh Gábor Sports Hall, which has a capacity of 1,000 people. They entered the top division Nemzeti Bajnokság I/A for the 2017–18 season. In DEAC's debut season, the team finished in 11th place.

In the 2018–19 season, DEAC reached the semi-finals of the Hungarian Cup for the first time in history.

Current players

Season by season

 Could not promote.
 Cancelled due to the COVID-19 pandemic in Hungary.

References

External links
Official website (in Hungarian)

Basketball teams in Hungary
Sports clubs in Debrecen
Basketball teams established in 2012
2012 establishments in Hungary
University of Debrecen